Picard is a lunar impact crater that lies in Mare Crisium. The crater is named for 17th century French astronomer and geodesist Jean Picard. It is the biggest non-flooded crater of this mare, being slightly larger than Peirce to the north-northwest. To the west is the almost completely flooded crater Yerkes. To east of Picard is the tiny Curtis.

Picard is a crater from the Eratosthenian period, which lasted from 3.2 to 1.1 billion years ago.  Inside Picard is a series of terraces that seismologists have attributed to a collapse of the crater floor.  It has a cluster of low hills at the bottom.

Satellite craters

By convention these features are identified on lunar maps by placing the letter on the side of the crater midpoint that is closest to Picard. 

The following craters have been renamed by the IAU.

 Picard G — see Tebbutt.
 Picard H — see Shapley.
 Picard X — see Fahrenheit.
 Picard Z — see Curtis.

References

External links
 LTO-62A1 Yerkes — L&PI topographic map
 Map of the region
 Part of Picard crater: photo by Lunar Reconnaissance Orbiter with resolution 1,3 meters/pixel
 
 
 Picard in The-Moon Wiki

Impact craters on the Moon
Eratosthenian